Birger Larsen (22 December 1961 – 26 October 2016) was a Danish film director and screenwriter. He won the Bodil Award for Best Danish Film for his 1990 film Dance of the Polar Bears. He was also nominated for the Academy Award for Best Live Action Short Film for his film Sweethearts (1996). In 2013, he directed the first episode of Crimes of Passion.

Filmography

References

External links 
 
 
 
 Bodil award 1991

1961 births
2016 deaths
Danish film directors
Danish male screenwriters
Recipients of the Crown Prince Couple's Culture Prize
People from Hvidovre Municipality